Partners in Crime is a 1961 British crime film directed by Peter Duffell and starring Bernard Lee, Moira Redmond and John Van Eyssen. Part of the long-running series of Edgar Wallace Mysteries films made at Merton Park Studios, it is loosely based on the 1918 novel The Man Who Knew by Edgar Wallace.

Cast
 Bernard Lee as Inspector Mann 
 Moira Redmond as Freda Strickland 
 John Van Eyssen as Merril 
 Stanley Morgan as Sergeant Rutledge 
 Gordon Boyd as Rex Holland 
 Mark Singleton as Shilton 
 Victor Platt as Harold Strickland 
 Danny Sewell as Avery 
 Robert Sansom as Doctor 
 Nicholas Smith as Pawn Shop Assistant 
 Ernest Clark as Ashton 
 Richard Shaw as Bill Cross 
 Graham Leaman as Ballistics Scientist 
 Hilary Martyn as Rita 
 Clive Marshall as Tony Hart 
 Ruth Meyers as Mary Nuttal 
 Larry Martyn as Pete Lake 
 Deidre Day as Secretary 
 Peter Howard-Johnson as Police Sergeant

References

Bibliography
 Goble, Alan. The Complete Index to Literary Sources in Film. Walter de Gruyter, 1999.

External links

1961 films
British crime films
1961 crime films
Films set in England
Merton Park Studios films
Films directed by Allan Davis
Films based on British novels
Edgar Wallace Mysteries
1960s English-language films
1960s British films